Anne Margrethe Larsen (born 28 May 1950, in Haugesund, Rogaland) is a Norwegian politician representing the Liberal Party. She is currently a representative of Vest-Agder in the Storting and was first elected in 2005.

Storting committees
 2005–2009 member of the Foreign Affairs committee.
 2005–2009 member of the Extended Foreign Affairs committee.
 2005–2009 reserve member of the Electoral committee.

External links
 
  Venstre.no

1950 births
Living people
Liberal Party (Norway) politicians
Members of the Storting
Women members of the Storting
21st-century Norwegian politicians
21st-century Norwegian women politicians